is a vertically scrolling video game produced by Nichibutsu (Nihon Bussan) and released in arcades in 1980. In North America, the game was also released by Taito America. Ports for the Arcadia 2001 and Atari 2600 were published in 1982, followed by the Famicom in 1986 and X68000 in 1993.

With the goal of scaling a series of skyscrapers using two joysticks (one controlling the left side of the character's body, the other the right) Crazy Climber was the first in a "climbing games" genre which includes Nintendo's 1981 Donkey Kong. The genre eventually became better known as platform games and is defined by jumping and traversal between platforms, neither of which are found in Crazy Climber.

Crazy Climber was the third highest-earning arcade game of 1980 in Japan while also being a commercial success in North America. A lesser-known sequel, Crazy Climber 2, was released for arcades in 1988.

Gameplay

The player assumes the role of a climber attempting to reach the top of four skyscrapers. The climber is controlled via two joysticks.

Obstacles
 Windows that open and close. 
 Residents who throw objects such as flower pots, buckets of water and fruit in an effort to knock the climber off the building.
 A condor, who drops eggs and excrement aimed at the climber.
 A giant ape whose punch can prove deadly.
 Falling steel girders and iron dumbbells.
 Live wires which protrude off electric Nichibutsu signs.
 Falling Crazy Climber signs.

Some of these dangers appear at every level of the game; others make appearances only in later stages. Should the climber succumb to any one of these dangers, a new climber takes his place at the exact point where he fell; the last major danger is eliminated.

One ally the climber has is a pink "Lucky Balloon"; if he is able to grab it, the climber is transported up 8 stories to a window. The window onto which it drops the climber may be about to close. If the window that the climber is dropped onto is fully closed, the balloon pauses there until the window opens up again. The player does not actually earn bonus points for catching the balloon, but he is awarded the normal 'step value' for each of the eight floors that he passes while holding the balloon.

If the climber is able to ascend to the top of a skyscraper and grabs the runner of a waiting helicopter, he earns a bonus and is transported to another skyscraper, which presents more dangers than the past. The helicopter only waits about 30 seconds before flying off.

If the player completes all four skyscrapers, he is taken back to the first skyscraper and the game restarts from the beginning, but the player keeps his score.

The difficulty level of any game was modified to take into account the skill of previous players. Hence if a player pushed the high score up to 250,000 any novice player following would get thoroughly wiped out for several games, due to the increased difficulty level, and have to play until it dropped back down.

Musical cues used throughout the game include "Baby Elephant Walk", "The Pink Panther Theme", and "The Entertainer".

If the climber is not moved for several seconds, a voice says "Go for it!"

The Family Computer version had a special controller that could be used with it.

Reception
In Japan, Crazy Climber was the third highest-grossing arcade game of 1980, just below Pac-Man and Galaxian. Crazy Climber was also Japan's eighth highest-grossing arcade game of 1981.

In North America, Crazy Climber was among the top ten highest-earning arcade games in the summer of 1982.

Legacy
 In 1981, Bandai Electronics manufactured a hand-held VFD version of the game.
 A 3D Board Game was released by Bandai in 1981, exclusively in Japan.
 Spider-Man (1982) for the Atari 2600 was similar to Crazy Cimber, a variation on its gameplay format with added web shooting and swinging abilities.
 A 1985 sequel titled Crazy Climber '85 was produced, but put into storage by Nichibutsu in favor of Terra Cresta. This unreleased sequel was eventually included in on the PlayStation version of Nichibutsu Arcade Classics.
 A Japanese-only sequel, Crazy Climber 2, was produced in 1988. The game was essentially identical to Crazy Climber in gameplay but featured more sophisticated graphics and a few new features.
 On February 3, 1996, Hyper Crazy Climber was released only in Japan for the PlayStation. It has similar gameplay to that of the original game but also a few differences. Players can choose between three cartooney characters, each with their own strength/speed attributes. Several buildings can be selected from a Bomberman-style map screen, including an underwater building, a medieval clock tower, a haunted skyscraper, and a beanstalk. Power-ups are also used. It was also released for Windows on November 30, 1996.
 On March 2, 2000, Crazy Climber 2000 was released for the PlayStation. This is more of a remake of the original arcade game using 3D graphics for the first time. A notable feature is the ability to turn corners and access different sides of the buildings, which now have a variety of designs (including one with a cylindrical, tower-like shape). The game included the original port of the arcade Crazy Climber and a scan of the instruction panel. Like Hyper Crazy Climber which released for the same console 4 years earlier, Crazy Climber 2000 was released only in Japan.
 Japanese publisher HAMSTER released the arcade version of Crazy Climber under their Oretachi Geasen Zoku Sono (オレたちゲーセン族) classic game line for the PlayStation 2 on July 21, 2005.
 Crazy Climber Wii was released for the Wii in Japan on December 20, 2007.
 The arcade game was released on the Virtual Console in Japan on February 23, 2010.
 The game was released for the Nintendo Switch by HAMSTER under their Arcade Archives series in February 2018. It had been previously released on May 15, 2014, for the PlayStation 4 as the very first entry in the series.

References

External links

Crazy Climber at Atari Mania.
Crazy Climber at Arcade Archives Page

1980 video games
Action video games
Arcade video games
Atari 2600 games
Hamster Corporation franchises
NEC PC-8001 games
Nintendo Entertainment System games
Nintendo Switch games
PlayStation 4 games
Sharp MZ games
X68000 games
WonderSwan games
Nihon Bussan games
Multiplayer and single-player video games
Vertically-oriented video games
Video games developed in Japan
Virtual Console games